The Twenty-Seven Points is a double album by the Fall, released in 1995. Subtitled "Live 92-95" the album consists of live recordings made in various locations between 1991 and 1995, but also contains 2 previously unheard studio tracks as well as some mildly diverting interludes. Credits on the album are sketchy but the front cover lists the cities in which the tracks were recorded; Prague, Tel Aviv, London, Glasgow, New York City and Manchester.

Critical reception
Trouser Press wrote: "Composed of live tracks, rough demos and random interpolations from Glasgow, London, Manchester, New York, Prague and Tel Aviv, the 28-track, two-CD set is frustratingly uneven but ultimately captures the Fall live experience, complete with onstage disasters."

Track listing
Titles are given exactly as listed on the original sleeve.

Disc one

Note
Tracks 10 and 11 are listed on the cover as one track but indexed as 2 on the actual disc.

Disc two

Note
Tracks 15 and 16 are listed as one track but indexed as two on the disc.

2006 reissue 
The album was reissued by Castle Music in May 2006 in a remastered edition but with no additional material. However, as the release was mastered from the original vinyl, the original CD-only bonus tracks "Three Points" and "Up Too Much" are missing from this new version, despite being listed on the sleeve.

Personnel 
Adapted from the album liner notes.

The Fall
Mark E. Smith - vocals, tapes (etc)
Simon Wolstencroft - drums
Craig Scanlon - guitar
Steve Hanley - bass guitar, backing vocals
Karl Burns - drums, guitar, vocals
Brix - guitar, bass guitar, vocals
Julia Nagle - keyboards
Additional personnel 
Dave Bush - keyboards on "Big New Prinz", "Paranoid Man In Cheap Sh..t Room" and "Bounces - Leeds"
Kenny Brady - fiddle on "Prague 91/Mr Pharmacist"
Simon Rogers - machines on "Noel's Chemical Effluence"
Robert Gordon - bass and keyboards on "Cloud of Black"
Rex Sargeant - mix, compilation
Andy Bernstein - sound on tracks 8-23
Anthony Frost - art 
Claus Castenskiold - art 
Pascal Le Gras - art
Lucy Rimmer - layout
Valerie Philips - photography
there is also an additional credit which appears to read Andy: Rime Time Studios, Ancoats, M/C

Notes

References

The Fall (band) live albums
1995 live albums